The 11th IKF World Korfball Championship was held in August 2019 in Durban, South Africa and won by the Netherlands. The International Korfball Federation awarded the hosting rights for the tournament to South Africa on 7 November 2015, ahead of the bid by New Zealand.

In October 2016, the number of teams participating was increased from 16 to 20. The four extra places were awarded to the Americas (1), Africa (1) and Asia & Oceania (2). The Americas are now allotted 2 spots, Africa 2 spots, Europe 10 spots, and Asia and Oceania 6 spots (with a minimum of 1 for Oceania). Due to withdrawals, in the end there will only be 1 team participating from the Americas and Africa (each), leading to 11 for Europe and 7 for Asia & Oceania.

This tournament also acted as the qualification tournament for Korfball at the World Games 2021, with eight teams qualifying for the World Games. The IKF aimed to have teams from up to four continents present at the World Games, therefore the top eight finishing nations qualified, with the exception that when a team finished in the top eleven as the highest finishing team from a top four continent not already having a qualifier, then this team would have qualified instead of the last placed team from an already qualified continent. This de facto meant that the top five finishers were always certain of qualification, while the outcome for the teams in places six through eight depended on the continent of origin of teams up to place eleven. Additionally, Catalonia was ineligible for qualification as the World Games are contested by national instead of regional teams.

Teams

Qualification
In February 2019, the IKF announced that both  and  withdrew from the tournament despite both having qualified for the first time ever. First reserve of the Americas was unable to step in and ultimately the first reserves of Europe and Asia were invited and accepted the invitation.

Draw
For the draw, the teams were allocated to four pots based on the IKF World Korfball Ranking of December 2018. Pot 1 contained the best five teams (which were automatically assigned to pools A through E), pot 2 contained the next best five teams, and so on for pots 3 and 4, with the exception of Suriname which was placed into pot 3 instead of 4 as the IKF specified that each continental champion would at least be positioned in pot 3. Finally, it is not allowed to have four European, three Asian or two Oceanian countries in the same pool. In case this happens during the draw, the relevant country will change position with the country drawn after. In case this is not possible, the change will be made with the country that has been drawn before.

The draw took place on 20 April 2019.

Group stage
Competing countries will be divided into five groups of four teams (groups A to E). Teams in each group played one another in a round-robin basis, with the top three teams of each group and the best fourth-placed team advancing to the knockout stage.

Group A

Group B

Group C

Group D

Group E

Ranking of fourth-placed teams

Knockout stage

Round of 16

Quarter-finals

Finals for 9th–16th places

Finals for 17th–20th places

Round-robin stage

19th-20th place match

17th-18th place match

Venue
Two venues are used to host all games this championship. Both are located on the Westville campus of the University of KwaZulu-Natal.

Final standings

See also
Korfball World Championship
International Korfball Federation

Notes

References

External links
International Korfball Federation

IKF World Korfball Championship
International sports competitions hosted by South Africa
Sports competitions in Durban
IKF
IKF
Korfball in South Africa
IKF World Korfball Championship